Panikhaiti is a village in Kamrup, situated in south bank of Brahmaputra river.

Transport
Panikhaiti is accessible through National Highway 37. All major private commercial vehicles ply between Panikhaiti and Guwahati.

See also
 Palahartari
 Paneri

References

Villages in Kamrup district